Wroth is a surname, and may refer to:

 Henry Wroth, an English royalist soldier
 John Wroth, any of several people of that name
 Krysty Wroth a fictional character
 Lawrence C. Wroth (1884 – 1970) an American historian
 Lady Mary Wroth (1587–1651/3)  an English poet
 Robert Wroth (Middlesex MP) (1540?–1606) an English politician who was a member of 10 parliaments
 Robert Wroth (died 1614) English politician
 Robert Wroth (Guildford MP) (1660–1720) an English MP
 Thomas Wroth (politician, 16th century) (c.1518–1573) an English courtier and politician
 Thomas Wroth (politician, 17th century) (1584–1672) an English parliamentarian politician
 William Wroth (1576–1642), minister of the Church of England
 Warwick William Wroth (1858–1911), antiquarian
 Wroth baronets, created on 29 November 1660 for John Wroth